Macario "Boy" Asistio Jr. (April 6, 1936  – February 6, 2017) was the mayor of Caloocan in Metro Manila, Philippines for two terms 1980 to 1986; and 1988 to 1995. Asistio unsuccessfully run for mayor again in 2013 and 2016. His father, Macario Asistio, Sr. was mayor of Caloocan from 1962-1971.

Personal life 
Asistio has two partners actress Veronica Jones and Nadia Montenegro. He has 5 children with Veronica Jones and 8 children with Nadia Montenegro. He also had 2 children with former singer Jhoanna Garcia and another 24 children with 4 more ex-spouses.

Former Mayor Boy’s children with former actress Veronica Jones are (eldest to youngest) Abbigail (known as Abby, a singer) Anna, Angelica, Arriane, and Macario III.
Boy’s children with actress Nadia Montenegro are (eldest to youngest) Alyssa, Alynna, Alyana, Anyka, Alexander, Alysha and Sofia. 
His children with former singer Jhoanna Garcia are Adelaide and Alexis.

Health and death 
Asistio had suffered from sleep apnea in June 2013 and was admitted to a hospital.

He died on 6 February 2017 at the age of 80 at the Metro Antipolo Hospital and Medical Center. He was in coma and admitted to the intensive care unit.

References 

Mayors of Caloocan
1930s births
2017 deaths
People from Tondo, Manila